Molle Islands is a national park in North Queensland, Australia, 913 km northwest of Brisbane.  The park covers several continental islands a short distance offshore including Long Island, Tancred Island, Repair Island, Planton Island, Goat Island, Denman Island and the majority of North Molle Island, Mid Molle Island and South Molle Island.  The park features white sandy beaches, open eucalypt forests, rainforest-clad gullies and grasslands.  The traditional owners of the islands were the Ngaro people.

Environment

211 different species have been identified in Molle Islands National Park.  This includes two vulnerable species, the coastal sheath-tailed bat and the beach stone-curlew.

Recreation

On South Molle Island and Long Island there are marked walking tracks.  Most are graded easy and some are suitable for mountain biking. Viewing wildlife, swimming and snorkelling are other popular recreational activities.

Access
The park is accessed by boat from Airlie Beach or Shute Harbour.  Tour operators provide day tours and ferry transfer is available from nearby resort islands.

Facilities
There are numerous locations available to campers.  Some have picnic tables and toilets. Open fires and ash-producing stoves are banned.

See also

 Protected areas of Queensland

References

National parks of Queensland
Whitsunday Islands